Astell is a surname. Notable people with the surname include:

Betty Astell (1912–2005), English actress
John Harvey Astell (1806–1887), British politician
Mary Astell (1666–1731), English writer, philosopher, and rhetorician
William Astell (1774–1847), English Member of Parliament and director of the East India Company